Chinese Cinderella: The Secret Story of an Unwanted Daughter (Wishbones) is a non-fiction book by Chinese-Canadian physician and author Adeline Yen Mah describing her experiences growing up in China. First published in 1999, Chinese Cinderella is a revised version of part of her 1997 autobiography, Falling Leaves. Her mother died after giving birth to her (of blood loss) and she is known to her family as the worst luck ever. Her father remarries a woman who stays at home and looks after the children for a living while treating Adeline and her step-siblings harshly and spoiling her own children with many luxurious things. An extract of this book is also part of the anthology of Edexcel English Language IGCSE new specification.

Plot
Ever since Adeline was born, she had been rejected coldly because her family believed her to bring bad luck.  Her father's first wife died two weeks after giving birth to her, the fifth child. Soon, her father remarries Jeanne Prosperi (referred to as "Niang" in most of the story, an alternate term for "mother" in Mandarin Chinese), a beautiful half-French woman. She regards his first five children, especially Adeline, with distaste and cruelty while favouring her younger son, Franklin, and daughter, Susan, both born soon after the marriage.

The book outlines Adeline's struggle to find a place where she feels she belongs. She did not get very much love from her parents, she finds some solace in relationships with her grandfather (Ye Ye) and her Aunt Baba, but they are taken from her as Niang deems them to exert a bad influence on the children. Adeline immerses herself in striving for academic achievement in the hope of winning her family's appreciation, but also for its own rewards as she finds great pleasure in words and scholarly success, progressing in things that her father and step-mother had never expected, for example by topping her class. She has many friends at school who love her for who she is, but they do not know about her inside life.

IGCSE Extract Synopsis

While at boarding school in Hong Kong, Adeline is taken away by her chauffeur and told that Ye Ye has died, leaving her broken-hearted but the rest of her family is indifferent. Her love for her grandfather is resonated when she reads King Lear, inspiring her to submit a work of writing for an international playwriting competition and study at an English university. However, Adeline worries over what might happen to her when she returns home and is conflicted between her decisions.

While playing with her friends at boarding school, Adeline is interrupted and taken home by her chauffeur to see her father. In his room ("The Holy of Holies"), she is informed that she has earned first place in the international playwriting competition. Delighted and surprised, Adeline gathers her courage to ask him for permission to study in England with her brothers in the field of literature and creative writing. Not surprisingly, her father immediately rejects her idea and sends her to a medical school that specialises in obstetrics. Nevertheless, Adeline is overjoyed to have the opportunity to study overseas, and agrees.

References

External links
 Chinese Cinderella on the author's official website
 Extract from the book at Penguin Books Australia

1999 American novels
American autobiographical novels
American children's novels
Novels set in England
Novels by Adeline Yen Mah
1999 children's books